Lawrence Herbert Gray (1915–1983) was an English first-class cricketer and Test match umpire. Born in Tottenham in 1915, he played 219 matches for Middlesex as a right arm fast medium bowler between 1934 and 1951. He took 637 wickets at 25.13 with a best of 8 for 59. He took 5 wickets in an innings 26 times and 10 wickets in a match on 3 occasions. He then turned to umpiring, standing in the England v South Africa test at Lord's in 1955 and the England v West Indies match at Birmingham in 1963.  He died in Essex in 1983.

References

1915 births
English cricketers
Middlesex cricketers
English Test cricket umpires
1983 deaths
Marylebone Cricket Club cricketers
Players cricketers
North v South cricketers
East of England cricketers